Bruno Maldaner (August 4, 1924 – November 16, 2008) was a Brazilian Bishop for the Catholic Church.

Maldaner was ordained a Priest at the age of 26 and appointed Auxiliary Bishop of São Paulo, Brazil and Titular Bishop of Aquae in Mauretania on April 15, 1966. He was later appointed Bishop of Frederico Westphalen, Brazil on May 27, 1997. He retired in 2001.

Maldaner died on November 16, 2008.

See also

References

External links
Catholic-Hierarchy

1924 births
2008 deaths
20th-century Roman Catholic bishops in Brazil
Roman Catholic bishops of São Paulo